Ramon Zenker (born 11 November 1968) is a German music producer, songwriter, sound engineer and remixer. He is a member of Hardfloor, Fragma Paffendorf and E-Trax, who had a UK #60 hit with Let's Rock.

Zenker started playing keyboards and bass guitar at the age of 12, although synthesizers soon became his main interest. Zenker has released music under various names and is still today involved in many projects. This includes chart successes with acts such as Bellini, Fragma and Paffendorf, as well as lesser known "non-commercial" projects such as Interactive, Hardfloor and Da Damn Phreak Noize Phunk.

Notable works
 Interactive - Who is Elvis (1991)
 Hardfloor - Acperience 1 (1993)
 Interactive - Forever Young (1994)
 Perplexer - Acid Folk (1994)
 Celvin Rotane – I Believe (1995)
 Bellini - Samba de Janeiro (1997)
 Paffendorf - Where Are You? (1999)
 Fragma - Toca Me (1999) and Toca's Miracle (2000)
 Fragma - Everytime You Need Me (2000)
 Fragma - You Are Alive (2001)
 Paffendorf - Be Cool (2001)
 Paffendorf - Lalala Girl (2006)

References

Living people
German electronic musicians
German record producers
1968 births